Koseze is a small settlement southeast of Vodice on the road to Mengeš in the Upper Carniola region of Slovenia.

History
Together with neighboring Kot and Potok, Koseze was annexed by Šinkov Turn in 1953. However, in 1955 Koseze was made a separate settlement again.

References

External links
Koseze on Geopedia

Populated places in the Municipality of Vodice